Vancouver Community Network (VCN) is a community-owned provider of free internet access, technical support, and web hosting services to individuals and nonprofit organizations in Vancouver, British Columbia.

It developed StreetMessenger, a communication service for the homeless.

History
The organization was founded as Vancouver FreeNet by Brian Campbell and others.

Revenue Canada initially rejected VCN's application status as a charitable organization, which would have allowed it to receive tax-deductible contributions. VCN appealed this decision, and in 1997, the Federal Court of Appeal ruled that providing free internet service was a charitable tax purpose.

See also
 Chebucto Community Network
 Free-Net
 Wireless community network
 Community informatics
 National Capital Freenet

References

External links
 

1993 establishments in British Columbia
Bulletin board systems
Community networks
Free web hosting services
Information technology charities
Internet service providers of Canada
Non-profit organizations based in Vancouver
Web hosting